Nemoleontini is an antlion tribe in the subfamily Myrmeleontinae.

Subtribes and genera 
Subtribe Dimarellina
 Brasileon
 Dimarella
Subtribe Nemoleontina
 Nemoleon
Subtribe Neuroleontina
 Araucaleon
 Distoleon
 Elachyleon
 Eremoleon
 Euptilon
 Glenurus
 Navasoleon
 Neuroleon
 Paraglenurus
 Purenleon
 Ripalda
 Rovira
 Sericoleon
Other genera
 Capicua
 Creoleon
 Delfimeus
 Deutoleon
 Ganguilus
 Noaleon

References

External links 

Myrmeleontinae
Insect tribes